Ischnarctia is a genus of tiger moths in the family Erebidae erected by Max Bartel in 1903.

Species
Ischnarctia brunnescens Bartel, 1903
Ischnarctia cinerea (Pagenstecher, 1903)
Ischnarctia oberthueri (Rothschild, 1910)

References

External links

Nyctemerina
Moth genera